Dimethoxybromoamphetamine (DOB), also known as brolamfetamine (INN) and bromo-DMA, is a psychedelic drug and substituted amphetamine of the phenethylamine class of compounds. DOB was first synthesized by Alexander Shulgin in 1967. Its synthesis and effects are documented in Shulgin's book PiHKAL: A Chemical Love Story.

Chemistry

The full name of the chemical is 2,5-dimethoxy-4-bromoamphetamine. DOB has a stereocenter and R-(–)-DOB is the eutomer. This is an important finding as it is suggestive that it is targeting different receptors relative to most other phenethylamines (e.g. MDMA) where the R-isomer serves as the distomer. The toxicity of DOB is not fully known, although high doses may cause serious vasoconstriction of the extremities. DOB is one of the most potent compounds in PiHKAL; while the active dose is similar to that of DOI, another psychedelic amphetamine, DOB has been shown to have a higher efficacy in triggering downstream effects mediated by 5-HT2 receptors, making it likely to be slightly more dangerous than DOI in overdose, due to greater vasoconstrictive action.  Omission of the amphetamine related α-methyl leads to 2C-B, a compound that possesses a lower affinity for the 5-HT2A receptor and is a weaker receptor agonist which results in drastically reduced vasoconstriction.

Pharmacology
DOB is a 5-HT2A, 5-HT2B, and 5-HT2C receptor agonist or partial agonist. Its psychedelic effects are mediated by its agonistic properties at the 5-HT2A receptor. Due to its selectivity, DOB is often used in scientific research when studying the 5-HT2 receptor subfamily. It is an agonist of human TAAR1.

It has been suggested that DOB is a prodrug metabolized in the lungs.

Excessively high doses of this hallucinogen may cause diffuse arterial spasm. The vasospasm responded readily to intra-arterial and intravenous vasodilators, such as tolazoline.

Legal status

Internationally DOB is a Schedule I substance under the Convention on Psychotropic Substances and the drug is legal only for medical, industrial or scientific purposes.

Canada
Listed as a Schedule 1 as it is an analogue of amphetamine.

Australia
DOB is considered a Schedule 9 prohibited substance in Australia under the Poisons Standard (February 2017). A Schedule 9 substance is a substance which may be abused or misused, the manufacture, possession, sale or use of which should be prohibited by law except when required for medical or scientific research, or for analytical, teaching or training purposes with approval of Commonwealth and/or State or Territory Health Authorities.

Russia
Schedule I, possession of at least 10 mg is a criminal offence.

United Kingdom
DOB is a Class A drug in the United Kingdom under the Misuse of Drugs Act 1971.

See also 
 2,5-Dimethoxy-4-Substituted Amphetamines
 2C-B - the alpha-desmethyl derivative of DOB
 4C-B - the alpha-ethyl homologue of DOB
 β-Methyl-2C-B
 DOB-FLY

References

External links 
 DOB Entry in PiHKAL
 DOB Entry in PiHKAL • info
 Erowid DOB Vault

Serotonin receptor agonists
Substituted amphetamines
Bromoarenes
2,5-Dimethoxyphenethylamines
Designer drugs
TAAR1 agonists